Ceramea is a genus of moths belonging to the subfamily Tortricinae of the family Tortricidae.

Species
Ceramea brunneica Razowski, 2008
Ceramea singularis Diakonoff, 1951

See also
List of Tortricidae genera

References

 , 1951, Ark. Zool. (2)3: 61.
 ,2005 World Catalogue of Insects 5
 , 2008, On two South Asian genera Ceramea Diakonoff and Terthreutis Meyrick (Lepidoptera: Tortricidae) Polish Journal of Entomology 77 (4): 283–299.

External links
 tortricidae.com

Archipini
Tortricidae genera
Taxa named by Alexey Diakonoff